Jhr. Frans Beelaerts van Blokland (21 January 1872, The Hague – 27 March 1956, The Hague) was a Dutch politician and diplomat.

Personal life
After attending the private school, Van Bouscholte, and Gymnasium Haganum, Beelaerts van Blokland studied at the Rijksuniversiteit Leiden from 1890 to 1895.

In 1905, he married Maria Adriana Snoeck (1873-1948), a courtier of Queen Wilhelmina, with whom he had two sons.

Career

Beelaerts van Blokland served as Dutch envoy to China.

Beelaerts van Blokland accompanied in May 1940 Queen Wilhelmina to London as her chief adviser. He was Minister of Foreign Affairs and then became Vice-President of the Council of State, a position he held for 23 years. He died at the age of 84, still in office.

He was a Knight Grand Cross of the Order of the Dutch Lion and Grand Officer of the Order of Orange-Nassau.

See also
List of Dutch politicians

References

1872 births
1956 deaths
Vice-presidents of the Council of State (Netherlands)
Ministers of Foreign Affairs of the Netherlands
Ministers of State (Netherlands)
Members of the Council of State (Netherlands)
Politicians from The Hague
Leiden University alumni
Grand Officers of the Order of Orange-Nassau
Commanders of the Order of the Netherlands Lion
20th-century Dutch diplomats
Diplomats from The Hague